Lions Lake is a lake in the U.S. state of Wisconsin.

Lions Lake was named in the 1950s after the Wisconsin Lions Foundation, which bought the property and established a lakeside summer camp. Lions Lake is a 45 acre lake located in Portage County. It has a maximum depth of 11 feet. Fish include Panfish, Largemouth Bass and Northern Pike.

References

Lakes of Wisconsin
Bodies of water of Portage County, Wisconsin